The Football Club of Greeks of Alexandria or "Greek Football Club", often mentioned, was founded in 1910 by Greek of the city gather every Sunday and played soccer being Ron Pointe.

Founding members 
The Football Club was founded in September 1910, says former magazine:

'An evening of September 21, 1910 some new fans they founded a small club, the "Hellenic Football Club Alexandria, at a time since the big clubs in our town Milo and Fans Club had not developed yet in football. "

Its founding members, who were also players of the club, reported by Savvas Kafkalas J. Saridakis, I. Stefanoudakis, S. Papadakis, G. Painter, No. Economides, G. Tsilivi, Averkiadis, Liverios, springs, Katrakis, I. Papadakis, Ant. Rallis. In 1911 the chair of the group took his son Emmanuel Benaki, Alexander.

Action 
The club used the Shatby stadium and the rent was paid by the chairman Alexander Benakis. Chaired by the Football Club has created a significant group of players: K. Salvagos, G. Vassiliadis, P. Vassiliadis, Al. Vassiliadis, D. Father, author, C. Melas, G. Armantzopoulo, A. Chrambanis, A. loss, etc. After the death of the president took Benaki N. Kanavos.

In 1927 the squad for the Group included: Balis, Skouloudis, Andreadis, Papafingos, Klonaris, Marinakis, Marinakis, Michelepis, Craps, Makris, Michaelides, Papadopoulos Valianatos, Yannis Ioannidis, Michelis, Patrinos et al.

After the war, the Group merged with the Athletic Union of Greek Alexandria, forming part of football.

Sources 
 This article is the translation of :el:Ποδοσφαιρικός Όμιλος Ελλήνων Αλεξάνδρειας

References 

 monastery Hatzifotiou, "Alexandria, the two centuries of modern Hellenism (19th–20th), 1999, p. 463 and 481.

Football clubs in Alexandria
Association football clubs established in 1910
1910 establishments in Egypt
Greek sports clubs outside Greece